Mazunga is a village in the Beitbridge District in the province of Matabeleland South, Zimbabwe. It is a station on the Beitbridge Bulawayo Railway.

Beitbridge District
Populated places in Matabeleland South Province